William Preston, D.D. (1729 – 19 April 1789) was an 18th-century Anglican bishop in Ireland.

Life
He was son of John Preston of Hincaster, Westmorland, by his third wife Ann. Educated at Heversham Grammar School, he was admitted a sizar at Trinity College, Cambridge in 1749, aged 19, and graduated B.A. in 1753, M.A. in 1756. He became a Fellow of Trinity in 1755, and was rector of Ockham, Surrey from 1764 to 1784, giving up his fellowship in 1765.

Preston spent some time as a chaplain to Philip Yonge, the bishop of Norwich. He then went to Vienna, as chaplain to Lord Stormont there. He acted as diplomat, British chargé d'affaires in Naples where he had moved for his health, in the absence of Sir William Hamilton. He was elected a Fellow of the Royal Society in 1778.

Becoming chaplain and secretary to Charles Manners, 4th Duke of Rutland, Preston was nominated as Bishop of Killala and Achonry on 13 October 1784, and consecrated on 11 November that year. Translated to Ferns and Leighlin on 9 November 1787, he died in Dublin on 19 April 1789 and was buried at Ferns Cathedral.

References

1729 births
1789 deaths
Bishops of Killala and Achonry
Bishops of Ferns and Leighlin
Fellows of Trinity College, Cambridge
Fellows of the Royal Society